Mansa Mahmud Keita IV (also known as Mansa Mamadou III, Mali Mansa Mamadou and Niani Mansa Mamadou) was the last emperor of the Mali Empire according to the Tarikh al-Sudan. Prior to his rule there was a vacancy of some sort, indicated by the long period of the time in which neither written or oral sources give a ruler. We do know that more than one person made a claim for the throne, which caused the Sankar-Zouma and Farima-Soura to refuse aid to Mansa Mahmud IV and the Keita family, on his military operation against Djenné.

Battle of Jenne

Mansa Mahmud Keita IV launched an attack on the city of Djenne in 1599 with Fulani allies, hoping to take advantage of the Songhai Empire's defeat. Moroccan fusiliers, deployed from Timbuktu, met them in battle, exposing Mali to the same technology (firearms) that had destroyed Songhai.  Despite heavy losses, the mansa’s army was not deterred and nearly prevailed;  however, the army inside Djenne intervened, forcing Mansa Mahmud Keita IV and his army to retreat to Kangaba.
Mandinka oral history says that the three sons of Mahmud IV divided the kingdom and fought amongst themselves.

References

See also
Mali Empire
Keita Dynasty

Mansas of Mali
People of the Mali Empire
16th-century African people
Keita family